Nick Didkovsky (born 22 November 1958) is a composer, guitarist, computer music programmer, and leader of the band Doctor Nerve. He is a former student of Christian Wolff, Pauline Oliveros and Gerald Shapiro.

Career
Didkovsky formed Doctor Nerve in 1984. He received a Masters in Computer Music from New York University in 1987 and went on to develop a Java music API called JMSL (Java Music Specification Language). JMSL is a toolbox for algorithmic composition and performance. JMSL includes JScore, an extensible staff notation editor. JMSL can output music using either JavaSound or JSyn. He has presented papers on his work at several conferences.

Ensemble activities include founding the blackened grindcore band Vomit Fist in 2013. He was a composing member of the Fred Frith Guitar Quartet for the ten years of the band's tenure, and has also played in John Zorn's band. His Punos Music record label is a harbor for his more extreme musical projects such as "split", a guitar collaboration with Dylan DiLella of the technical death metal band Pyrrhon.

His debut solo album was released in 1997 and featured contributions from Frith. His second album, Body Parts, came out of a collaboration with Guigou Chenevier.

Didkovsky has composed for or performed on a number of CDs including:
 1987, Doctor Nerve Armed Observation, Label: Cuneiform, produced by Fred Frith
 1988, Rascal Reporters Happy Accidents
 1995, Doctor Nerve SKIN, Label: Cuneiform
 1997
 Every Screaming Ear, Label: Cuneiform (January 21, 1997)
Ayaya Moses, with the Fred Frith Guitar Quartet
 Binky Boy
 1999, Upbeat, with the Fred Frith Guitar Quartet
 2000, Ereia, with Doctor Nerve and the Sirius String Quartet
 2003, Bone - uses wrist grab, with Hugh Hopper and John Roulat
 2015, Vomit Fist Forgive but Avenge
 2017 Alice Cooper Paranormal
 2019, Vomit Fist Omnicide

Didkovsky's music has also been arranged by the experimental music group Electric Kompany.  He is a co-owner of the "$100 Guitar", a guitar which was circulated amongst many musicians (including Alex Skolnick, Fred Frith, and Nels Cline) for the recording of a concept album about the guitar.

Solo discography
Now I Do This (1982), Punos Music
Binky Boy (1997), Punos
Body Parts (2000), Vand'Oeuvre
The Bright Lights The Big Time (2005), FMR
Tube Mouth Bow String (2006), Pogus
The $100 Guitar Project (2013), Bridge
Phantom Words (2017), Punos

Notes

Sources
 Couture, François "Body Parts Review", Allmusic. Retrieved August 16, 2014
 Dickenson, J. Andrew: "Electric Counterpoint", Urban Guitar, July 2006
 Dorsch, Jim "Nick Didkovsky Biography", Allmusic. Retrieved August 16, 2014
 Jurek, Thom "Binky Boy Review", Allmusic. Retrieved August 16, 2014
 Ross Feller, Ice Cream Time: The Raunchy and the Rigorous 
 Rose, Joe, A $100 Guitar Makes A 30,000-Mile Odyssey, National Public Radio, 4 December 2012

External links

Doctor Nerve Home Page
JMSL Home Page
Interview with New Sounds

Hundred-dollar Guitar Project

21st-century classical composers
Living people
1958 births
American male classical composers
American classical composers
21st-century American guitarists
20th-century American guitarists
American male guitarists
20th-century American male musicians
21st-century American male musicians